Hawker Siddeley RTC-85/SP/D were a series of railway coach and diesel multiple units manufactured by Hawker Siddeley Canada for GO Transit, largely based on the H-series subway cars that they built for the Toronto Transit Commission.

47 92-seat RTC cars were ordered and delivered to GO Transit in 1967, with 7 of them being built as single-level self-propelled units # D700, D701, D702 to D708 (later renumbered as 9825-9826, 9827-9833), 8 built as unpropelled cab cars (C750 to C757, later 9850 to 9857) and the remaining 32 as regular coaches (4700 to 4731, later 9900 to 9931). With additional cars being built until 1976, the eventual total of the fleet would number 117 cars. All cars were built at Hawker's Thunder Bay, Ontario plant. In 1975 the self-propelled cars were demotored and used as cab cars.

The motorized coaches were powered by a 330hp Rolls-Royce diesel engine, to be used in off-peak hours. They soon proved unable to keep up with traffic demands and were used with a diesel locomotive. 

The car builder decided to go with a proven design based on their subway cars, thinking that if the GO Transit service wasn't a success, the cars could easily be sold to other transit agencies who already used their subway cars. 

The cars (as designed) could hold 125 seats but GO Transit decided to have 92 seats installed, to avoid the cars feeling crowded. Features inside included large windows, bucket seating, armrests and card tables.  The cars also had motorized doors for ease of access, with a two-trumpet whistle over the driver and lacked a snowplow. 

The coaches soon proved unable to handle the large crowds along the lines and were replaced by the bi-level coaches now in service. The transit agency would never order single-level coaches after these were retired. 
 
All cars were withdrawn from service and sold off by GO Transit by 1995 with 6 scrapped and remaining sold to other operators:

 23 to Ontario Northland Railway, primarily used on the now-retired (And possible revival) Northlander
 92 to Agence métropolitaine de transport (now RTM) (now retired)
 11 cars to Pandrol-Jackson Electric Tamper and Equipment Company as crew-cars for rail grinding operations

In 2017, Car 104 was re-purchased and restored by GO Transit to celebrate their 50th anniversary. The cab car is now displayed at the Toronto Railway Museum in downtown Toronto.

Gallery

References

GO Transit
Multiple units of Canada